Craig Robert Sauvé (born 1981 in Montreal, Quebec) is a Canadian politician and musician. Currently serving as city councillor for the district of Saint-Henri—Little-Burgundy—Pointe-Saint-Charles in Le Sud-Ouest. He sits as an independent 
after leaving the Projet Montréal political party a week before the November 7, 2021 election. Previously he representing the Projet Montreal political party, he was elected in the 2013 Montreal municipal election.

While in the opposition, Sauvé was Projet Montréal's transport critic, and as such has taken positions in favour of increased active transport infrastructure, increasing funding for the STM, and against the highway 19 extension. Sauvé has also taken a public stand against reversing the flow of petroleum pipeline 9b  and opposed the P-6 bylaw.

He currently is a special advisor to the executive committee as well as vice-chair of the board of directors of the Société de transport de Montréal (STM).

Sauvé is also a heavy metal musician.

References

Montreal city councillors
1981 births
Living people
21st-century Canadian politicians